Reticule can refer to:

 Reticle, fine lines in the eyepiece of a sighting device
 Reticule (handbag), a type of small handbag